The men's 800 metres event at the 1965 Summer Universiade was held at the People's Stadium in Budapest on 25, 26 and 27 August 1965.

Medalists

Results

Heats

Semifinals

Final

References

Athletics at the 1965 Summer Universiade
1965